Cham-e Aqamordeh (also Romanized as Cham-e Āqāmordeh and Cham Āqā Mordeh) is a village in Chamsangar Rural District, Papi District, Khorramabad County, Lorestan Province, Iran. At the 2006 census, its population was 30, in 5 families.

References 

Towns and villages in Khorramabad County